KKGM (1630 AM) is a radio station licensed to Fort Worth, Texas, and serving the Dallas-Fort Worth Metroplex, owned and operated by iHeartMedia. The station broadcasts an African American targeted news format, as one of two local affiliates, along with KHVN (AM 970), of the national Black Information Network.

History
KKGM originated as the expanded band "twin" of an existing station on the standard AM band. On March 17, 1997 the Federal Communications Commission (FCC) announced that eighty-eight stations had been given permission to move to newly available "Expanded Band" transmitting frequencies, ranging from 1610 to 1700 kHz, with KHVN in Fort Worth authorized to move from 970 to 1630 kHz.

An application for the new expanded band station was filed in 1997, which was issued a Construction Permit the next year. This was assigned the call letters KBCM on March 6, 1998, which was changed to KOME on January 15, 1999, and to KNAX on March 20, 2001. The station began regular service in July 2002, initially with a Spanish religious format as "Radio Christiana"'

The FCC's initial policy was that both the original station and its expanded band counterpart could operate simultaneously for up to five years, after which owners would have to turn in one of the two licenses, depending on whether they preferred the new assignment or elected to remain on the original frequency. However, this deadline has been extended multiple times, and both stations have remained authorized. One policy the FCC has generally enforced is that the original stations and their expanded band counterparts must remain under common ownership, so in subsequent sales the two stations have been paired together.

KNAX applied for a move to Euless and for call letters "KHEV", but went with KKGM instead in 2004 with a Southern Gospel format. KKGM later switched to an all-talk format in 2011 as "Better Life Radio" with a mix of christian talk and conservative programming, including the controversial Alex Jones show, before changing back to a mix of Southern Gospel music along with featured talk a year later.

On December 2, 2020, iHeartMedia announced its purchase of KKGM and KHVN from Mortenson Broadcasting for $950,000, including its translators, K221GV (92.1 MHz) and K237HD (95.3 MHz). This included a Local marketing agreement (LMA) that took effect on January 2, 2021, continuing until full consummation. The purchase allowed iHeartMedia to max out its DFW cluster threshold of allowable station holdings. On December 24, it was announced that both stations would become affiliates of the Black Information Network on January 2, 2021, ending the black gospel formats.

On January 2, 2021, KKGM (erroneously identified as "KKMG" during top of hour legal IDs) and KHVN began stunting with African American speeches, interspersed with messages such as "Our Voices Will Be Heard" and "Our side of the story is about to be told," with the new Black Information Network (BIN) format officially launching on January 4 at Noon. The purchase was consummated on March 31, 2021.

References

External links
KKGM official website

 DFW Radio/TV History

KGM
Radio stations established in 2002
KGM
2002 establishments in Texas
Black Information Network stations
IHeartMedia radio stations